Abdullah Hadi Radif (born 20 January 2003) is a Saudi Arabian professional footballer who plays as a forward for Saudi Professional League side Al-Taawoun on loan from Al-Hilal.

Career statistics

Club

Honours

Club
Al-Hilal
 Saudi Professional League: 2021–22
 Saudi Super Cup: 2021
 AFC Champions League: 2021

International
Saudi Arabia U20
 Arab Cup U-20: 2021, 2022
Saudi Arabia U23
AFC U-23 Asian Cup: 2022

References

External links
 
 

2003 births
Living people
Association football forwards
Saudi Arabian footballers
Saudi Arabia youth international footballers
Saudi Arabia international footballers
Al Hilal SFC players
Al-Taawoun FC players
Saudi Professional League players